Oliver Stritzel (born 9 March 1957) is a German actor who specializes in dubbing.

Roles

Acting roles 
Das Boot (1981) – Schwalle
 (1982) – Krause
Bolero (1983)
Moving Targets (1984) – Zorro
Tango im Bauch (1985) – Sepp
Schleuse 17 (1985)
Das Mädchen mit den Feuerzeugen (1987) – Gast in Kneipe
Beule (1988) – Fred Frenzel
Race for Glory (1989) – Klaus Kroetter
Blutspur in den Osten (1995) – Hunzinger
Lea (1996) – Doctor
Unser fremdes Kind (1998) – Horst Schneider
Vortex (2001) – Richter-Stimme (voice)
Der Untergang (2004) – Johannes Hentschel
 (2005) – Polizist Voight
Der geköpfte Hahn (2007) – Eugen Goldschmidt
Wechselspiel (2013) – Joseph Hauswaldt

Television animation 
Hellsing (Alexander Anderson (Nachi Nozawa))

OVA 
Final Fantasy VII Advent Children (Rude (Taiten Kusunoki))

Theatrical animation 
A Bug's Life (Dim (Brad Garrett))
Hercules (Nessus the Centaur (Jim Cummings))
Home on the Range (Rico (Charles Dennis))
Ice Age: The Meltdown (The Lone Gunslinger (Will Arnett))
Kung Fu Panda 3 (Kai (J.K. Simmons))
The Little Mermaid (Flotsam and Jetsam (Paddi Edwards))
Mulan (Shan Yu (Miguel Ferrer))
Steamboy (Technician)
Treasure Planet (Scroop (Michael Wincott))
Tayo the Little Bus (Poco (Kevin Aichelle))
Wreck-It Ralph (General Hologram (Dennis Haysbert))
Zootopia (Chief Bogo (Idris Elba))

Live action dubbing 
Flawless (Rusty Zimmerman (Philip Seymour Hoffman))
Flubber (Smith (Clancy Brown))
Lost (Kelvin Joe Inman (Clancy Brown))
Magnolia (Phil Parma (Philip Seymour Hoffman))
Punch-Drunk Love (Dean Trumbell (Philip Seymour Hoffman))
Spawn (Spawn (Michael Jai White))
Street Fighter (M. Bison (Raúl Juliá))
The Talented Mr. Ripley (Freddie Miles (Philip Seymour Hoffman))
V for Vendetta (V (Hugo Weaving))

External links 

German Dubbing Card Index

1957 births
Living people
German male voice actors
Male actors from Berlin